Paul Schockemöhle (born 22 March 1945) is a German former showjumper. He was a successful international show jumping equestrian in the 1970s and 1980s at individual and team events in Olympic Games, World Championships and European Championships. He was three times European Champion on his best horse Deister. He is the brother of Alwin Schockemöhle, another leading German rider.

After competing as a rider Schockemöhle became both a breeder and trainer of sport horses. According to an interview in 2011, he estimated he owns 3,500 horses, including 35 show jumping and dressage stallions.  In October 2010, it was announced that he had purchased Moorlands Totilas, a champion dressage stallion shown by Edward Gal, from Moorlands Stables. In 2016, Paul Schockemöhle became the registered owner of all horses of Ukraine's Olympic Show Jumping team when their owner Oleksandr Onyshchenko was indicted for embezzlement before the 2016 Rio Olympics.

Controversies
In 1990, Schockemöhle was secretly recorded poling horses, a practice which involves hitting a horse's legs with a pole to train it to jump higher. Poling is forbidden by the International Equestrian Federation, and spot checks were subsequently carried out at several other German training establishments.

In 2012, PETA filed charges against Schockemöhle and Totilas' co-owner Ann Kathrin Linsenhoff alleging cruelty, claiming the stallion was kept in isolation from others and trained using the controversial method rollkur, which involves hyperflexion of the horse's neck.  German authorities opened an investigation, but dropped all charges in 2013.

Major achievements 
1976: Silver medal in team at the Olympic Games in Montreal with Agent
1981: Gold medal in team and individual at the European Championships in Munich with Deister
1983: Individual gold medal at the European Championships in Hickstead with Deister
1984: Bronze medal in team at the Olympic Games in Los Angeles with Deister
1985: Bronze medal in team and individual gold medal at the European Championships in Dinard with Deister
Hickstead Derby
 1982: Winner with Deister
 1985: Winner with Lorenzo
 1986: Winner with Deister

References

External links 
 Paul Schockemöhle official website
 Paul Schockemöhle and Deister in Gothenburg 1986 (Video)

1945 births
Living people
People from Vechta (district)
German male equestrians
German show jumping riders
People from Oldenburg (state)
Olympic equestrians of West Germany
Equestrians at the 1976 Summer Olympics
Equestrians at the 1984 Summer Olympics
Olympic bronze medalists for West Germany
Olympic medalists in equestrian
Medalists at the 1984 Summer Olympics
Medalists at the 1976 Summer Olympics
Olympic silver medalists for West Germany
Horse trader
Sportspeople from Lower Saxony